Cook Island, also known as London Island, is an island located in the Tierra del Fuego archipelago. It lies west of Gordon Island, south of O'Brien Island and east of Londonderry Island at the head of Cook Bay, within the Alberto de Agostini National Park.

Cook Island is the location of the Fueguino volcanic cones.

The island was named after Captain James Cook. Cook did not visit the island, but passed the mouth of Cook Bay on 19 December 1774. The bay was named in 1828 by Captain Henry Foster.

See also
 List of islands of Chile

References

External links
 Islands of Chile @ United Nations Environment Programme
 World island information @ WorldIslandInfo.com
 South America Island High Points above 1000 meters
 United States Hydrographic Office, South America Pilot (1916)

Islands of Tierra del Fuego